Foundations of Morality can refer to:

 The Foundations of Morality, a 1964 book by Henry Hazlitt
 Moral foundations theory